Pasarón may refer to:

Pasarón de la Vera, a municipality in Spain
Patricio Montojo y Pasarón (1839-1917), a Spanish admiral
Estadio Municipal de Pasarón, a football stadium in Pontevedra, Spain